Cindy Ryu is an American politician serving as a member of the Washington House of Representatives from the 32nd district. She was the first Korean-American woman to be a mayor in the United States. She is the Chair of the Community and Economic Development Committee and works on issues such as broadband deployment, catalytic converter thefts, consumer protection, outdoor recreation funding, increasing housing supply, and resilience of small businesses, communities, infrastructure and the environment.

Early life and education 
Ryu has lived in South Korea, Brunei, and the Philippines. She earned a Bachelor of Science in microbiology and a Master of Business Administration in operations management from the University of Washington.

Career
While serving as a member of the Shoreline City Council, Ryu was elected mayor in 2008, becoming the first female Korean-American mayor in the United States. Cindy was president of both the Shoreline Chamber of Commerce and its Dollars For Scholars Chapter. She helped create Shoreline's Green Business Program.

Cindy was first elected to the Washington House of Representatives in 2010, and was reelected in 2012, 2014, 2016, 2018 and 2020. Cindy previously chaired the Housing, Community Development & Veterans Committee and the Overseas Korean Politicians Council. She is Chair of Women In Government, a national organization of women state legislators.

References

External links
House Democrats page

American mayors of Korean descent
American women of Korean descent in politics
Asian-American people in Washington (state) politics
Democratic Party members of the Washington House of Representatives
Living people
Women state legislators in Washington (state)
Mayors of places in Washington (state)
Women mayors of places in Washington (state)
People from Shoreline, Washington
21st-century American politicians
21st-century American women politicians
1957 births